Nemacheilus kapuasensis is a species of cyprinid fish in the genus Nemacheilus from Borneo and Sumatra.

Footnotes 

 

K
Taxa named by Maurice Kottelat
Fish described in 1984